Megan McNeil (September 7, 1990 – January 28, 2011) was a Canadian singer. The only child of Dave and Suzanne McNeil, she was diagnosed in 2006 with adrenalcortical carcinoma, a rare type of adrenal cancer when she was 16 years old.

She studied at Seaquam Secondary and graduated in 2008. She also attended Kwantlen Polytechnic University in Surrey for Sciences. She beat cancer back three times, but succumbed during her fourth battle, at the age of 20.

"The Will to Survive"

McNeil gained media attention when she recorded a charity single written by her entitled The Will to Survive as a tribute to tens of thousands of cancer-fighting children and youth. The lyrics include:
Here’s to the fight
Here’s to the fighters
Here’s to the brave that take this on
Here’s to the lost souls
Here’s to the new hope
We’ll keep on keeping on
Megan McNeil wrote the lyrics in 2006 just 2 months after being diagnosed with cancer. The song was recorded in 2010 at Nimbus School of Recording Arts with producer Garth Richardson. The song was arranged by Ryan McMahon. A music video was shot by director Tash Baycroft. The proceeds from the single went to childhood cancer organizations.

Death
She died on January 28, 2011, aged 20.

Popular media
 McNeil's story touched millions across Canada and the United States through many media appearances in promoting childhood cancer awareness and such charities as The British Columbia Childhood Cancer Parents' Association (BCCCPA) and The James Fund. McNeil appeared in features in Europe as well.
 Canada AM selected McNeil's story one of the best of 2010
 CBC News selected hers as the most inspirational story of the year in Canada

Discography
2010: "The Will to Survive"

References

External links
Will to Survive website
Megan McNeil MySpace

1990 births
2011 deaths
Canadian women singers
Deaths from adrenocortical cancer
Deaths from cancer in British Columbia